Erotophobia is a term coined by a number of researchers in the late 1970s and early 1980s to describe one pole on a continuum of attitudes and beliefs about sexuality. The model of the continuum is a basic polarized line, with erotophobia (fear of sex or negative attitudes about sex) at one end and erotophilia (positive feelings or attitudes about sex) at the other end.

The word erotophobia is derived from the name of Eros, the Greek god of erotic love, and Phobos, Greek for "fear".

Types
Erotophobia has many manifestations. An individual or culture can have one or multiple erotophobic attitudes. Some types of erotophobia include fear of nudity, fear of sexual images, negative attitudes towards homosexuality, fear of sex education, fear of sexual discourse.

Clinical erotophobia
As a clinical phobia, 'erotophobia' describes an irrational and potentially debilitating fear of some object, person or act that is related to sex. This fear either impairs a person's desire or ability to have sexual relationships, or completely prevents a person's ability to have sex. Erotophobia can also in some (but not all) individual cases, be a part of larger patterns of any of the following psychological problems—social phobia, avoidant personality disorder, body dysmorphic disorder, or general social anxiety problems. Erotophobia can also, for others, be very specific to love making with another person and not be related to any of these other social anxiety disorders. In the case of specific erotophobia, only the fear of something related to sex would be present without any other fears or syndromes.

Psychological studies
In psychological studies, the term is often used to describe degree of (general) sexual aversion versus (general) interest in sex. In this sense erotophobia is descriptive of one's place in a range on a continuum of sexual feeling or aversion to feeling. Erotophobes score high on one end of the scale that is characterized by expressions of guilt and fear about sex. Psychologists sometimes attempt to describe sexuality on a personality scale. Erotophobes are less likely to talk about sex, have more negative reactions to sexually explicit material, and have sex less frequently and with fewer partners over time. In contrast, erotophiles score high on the opposite end of the scale, erotophilia, which is characterized by expressing less guilt about sex, talking about sex more openly, and holding more positive attitudes toward sexually explicit material.

This dimension of personality is used to assess openness to sex and sexuality.  It is an important dimension to measure because of the health and safety risks associated with poor sexual education. Research on this personality dimension has shown a correlation between high erotophobia scores and a less consistent use of contraception and a lack of knowledge about human sexuality.

It is also important because erotophobia has been shown to create relationship and marital difficulties in multiple studies, dating back to Kinsey.

Political use 
 
The word erotophobia has been used by anti-oppression activists to describe sex-negative attitudes as a form of discrimination and oppression (akin to homophobia). In "Disability, Sex Radicalism, and Political Agency", Abby Wilkinson argues that "constraints on sexual agency should be recognized as a hallmark of oppression." In "Unpacking the Invisible Knapsack of Sexual Conservatism" (after Peggy McIntosh's influential "White Privilege: Unpacking the Invisible Knapsack"), TJ Bryan says, "Since power-based hierarchies in society form a matrix of domination, I understand that erotophobia occupies a supportive space adjacent to isms and phobias like classism, racism, sexism, ableism, homophobia."

In his book The Politics of Lust, author and sexual activist John Ince examines three distinct cause and effect forces that fuel erotophobia: "antisexualism", the irrational negative response to harmless sexual expression; "nasty sex", which includes rape and violent pornography; and "rigidity", the inability to enjoy "playful and spontaneous" sex. Ince also argues that social inequality and politics are interlinked with erotophobia and that overcoming erotophobia is one of the first steps to a truly democratic society.

See also

References 

Phobias
Prudishness
Non-sexuality
Sexuality-related prejudices